Agrostistachys hookeri is a species of plant in the family Euphorbiaceae. It is endemic to Sri Lanka.

Culture
Known as මහ බෙරු (maha beru) in Sinhala.

References

Agrostistachydeae
Flora of Sri Lanka
Critically endangered plants
Taxonomy articles created by Polbot
Plants described in 1861
Taxa named by Joseph Dalton Hooker
Taxa named by George Bentham